Nivedita Tiwari is an Indian actress best known for her role as Runjhun in Zee TV's Bhagonwali - Baante Apni Taqdeer and Supriya on &TV's Gangaa.

Early life
Nivedita was born and raised in Ayodhya, Uttar Pradesh. She completed her schooling from JB Academy, Ayodhya, and attended the University of Delhi where she studied English Literature.

Film and television career
Nivedita initially became known when she was shortlisted as one of three candidates in the running to play the role of Anandi in Colors' television show Balika Vadhu. She was later cast in a lead role in Bhagonwali - Baante Apni Taqdeer as Runjhun Mishra, a girl who is destined to bring good luck wherever she goes. The show aired on Zee TV from 2010-2012.  During this period, Nivedita made guest appearances on an episode of Yahaaan Main Ghar Ghar Kheli and Star Ya Rockstar.  She also appeared on an episode of Ram Milaayi Jodi in a dance performance.

Nivedita acted in the movie Khap as Sureeli, a girl who is murdered by the men in her town because she chose to marry someone from the same village.  The movie touched on the issues surrounding honour killings.

At the end of 2012, she appeared on two different episodes of the weekly television show Lakhon Mein Ek on STAR Plus. Each episode of the show reflects a different story based on real life events. In the first appearance, she was cast opposite Ravi Dubey portraying the character of Afreen. The episode focused on the issue of dowry and told the real-life story of Sohail and Afreen's fight against this practice.  Next, she acted alongside Ankit Bathla and Rita Bhaduri in an episode that told the story of Preeti and Sunil and their struggle to get married. She also appeared in an episode of Yeh Hai Aashiqui alongside Raj Singh Arora and Pallavi Gupta.

In 2014, she was cast in the lead role of Sahara One's Phir Jeene Ki Tamanna Hai as Devyani and as Parvati in Neeli Chatri Waale.  Nivedita has appeared in several television commercials.

Nivedita appeared as Supriya on Gangaa and next will be seen in the film Fraud Saiyaan produced by Prakash Jha. She is currently a Research Fellow at Vision India Foundation, a New Delhi based think tank which works on public leadership amongst the youth.

Personal life
Nivedita enjoys creative writing, singing, and reading. She regularly posts her own works on her blog. Nivedita married Ankur Pegu, Co-Founder and Director of Swasth India, on 4 December 2011 in her hometown Faizabad. Presently, she is working for the New India Junction.

Filmography

References

External links

Living people
Indian film actresses
21st-century Indian actresses
Indian soap opera actresses
Indian television actresses
Delhi University alumni
People from Faizabad
Actresses from Uttar Pradesh
1985 births